Orchis canariensis is a species of orchid endemic to the Canary Islands.

Description 
Previously described as a subspecies of Orchis patens, it is now accepted as a separate species also supported by a molecular study that has highlighted a significant genetic difference between the two taxa.

Orchis canriensis is a bulbous geophyte, which grows to  basal leaves are wide, ovate, dark green and slightly shiny, and never spotted. Flower stems are green to reddish-purple. Flowers are lilac or pink, sometimes green in the central part of the sepal, with purple markings on the lower lips.

Seeds are clavate with 5 to 7 cells in the longitudinal axis. Seeds showed straight to sinuous anticlinal walls and no ornamentations in the periclinal walls.

Biology 
Orchis canariensis associates with the mycorrhizal fungus Tulasnella helicospora

The chromosome number of Orchis canariensis is 2n=84

Distribution and habitats 
Orchis canariensis occurs in five out of seven Canary Islands (Spain), with the exception of Lanzarote and Fuerteventura. 

It usually grows in rocky walls with mossy shelves with accumulation of litter and pine needles or in pine forests, generally occurring between 500 and 1,300 m altitude.

Conservation 
Orchis canariensis is currently listed together with O. patens as “Endangered” in the European IUCN Red List

References 

Orchids of Europe
Orchis
Species described in 1835
Flora of the Canary Islands
Taxa named by John Lindley